Billy Cole (9 August 1909 – 24 August 1958) was an  Australian rules footballer who played with St Kilda in the Victorian Football League (VFL).

Cole began his senior career in the Victorian Football Association with the Northcote Football Club, where he played 101 games. He then joined VFL club St Kilda in 1935, and played 29 games in three years.

Notes

External links 

1909 births
1958 deaths
Australian rules footballers from Victoria (Australia)
St Kilda Football Club players
Northcote Football Club players